Jacob Steven Brentz (born September 14, 1994) is an American professional baseball pitcher for the Kansas City Royals of Major League Baseball (MLB). He was drafted in the 11th round of the 2013 MLB draft by the Toronto Blue Jays and made his MLB debut in 2021 for the Royals.

Career
Brentz attended Parkway South High School in Manchester, Missouri.

Toronto Blue Jays
He was drafted by the Toronto Blue Jays in the 11th round of the 2013 Major League Baseball draft. On July 12, 2013, Brentz signed with the Blue Jays. Brentz made his professional season with the Gulf Coast Blue Jays.

Seattle Mariners
On July 31, 2015, the Blue Jays traded Brentz, Rob Rasmussen and Nick Wells to the Seattle Mariners for Mark Lowe. He finished the season with the Low-A Everett AquaSox. In 2016, he split the season with Everett and the Single-A Clinton LumberKings, also appearing in two games for the Triple-A Tacoma Rainiers.

Pittsburgh Pirates
On September 1, 2016, the Mariners traded Brentz along with Pedro Vasquez to the Pittsburgh Pirates in exchange for Arquimedes Caminero. Brentz split the 2017 and 2018 season between the High-A Bradenton Marauders and Double-A Altoona Curve. Brentz started the 2019 season with Altoona before being promoted to the Triple-A Indianapolis Indians. On August 16, 2019, the Pirates released Brentz.

Kansas City Royals
On August 20, 2019, Brentz signed a minor league contract with the Kansas City Royals organization. He finished the 2019 season with the Double-A Northwest Arkansas Naturals, hurling 5.1 innings of 3.38 ERA ball with 8.4 K/9. On July 19, 2020, Brentz was added to the Royals 60-man player pool, a replacement for the minor leagues due to the cancellation of the Minor League Baseball season because of the COVID-19 pandemic. Brentz was invited to Spring Training for the Royals in 2021. 

On April 1, 2021, Brentz had his contract selected to the 40-man roster, and it was announced that he had made the Royals Opening Day roster. On April 3, 2021, Brentz made his MLB debut in relief against the Texas Rangers, pitching a scoreless 2/3 inning and notching his first major league strikeout, striking out Rangers first baseman Nate Lowe. 

Brentz began the 2022 season with Kansas City, posting a 0–3 record and 23.63 ERA with nine strikeouts in eight appearances. On June 12, 2022, Brentz was placed on the 60-day injured list with a left flexor strain. He underwent Tommy John surgery on July 21, ending his season. On November 18, 2022, it was announced that the Royals would not tender Brentz a contract for the 2023 season, making him a free agent.

On March 16, 2023, Brentz signed a two-year contract with the Royals.

References

External links

Living people
1994 births
People from Ballwin, Missouri
Baseball players from Missouri
Major League Baseball pitchers
Kansas City Royals players
Gulf Coast Blue Jays players
Bluefield Blue Jays players
Everett AquaSox players
Clinton LumberKings players
Tacoma Rainiers players
Bradenton Marauders players
Altoona Curve players
Indianapolis Indians players
Northwest Arkansas Naturals players